The Holy Family is a book written by Karl Marx and Friedrich Engels in November 1844. The book is a critique of the Young Hegelians and their trend of thought, which was very popular in academic circles at the time. The title was a suggestion by the publisher and is meant as a sarcastic reference to the Bauer Brothers and their supporters. The book created a controversy with much of the press and caused Bruno Bauer to refute the book in an article which was published in Wigand's Vierteljahrsschrift in 1845. Bauer claimed that Marx and Engels misunderstood what he was saying. Marx later replied to his response with his own article that was published in the journal Gesellschaftsspiegel in January 1846. Marx also discussed the argument in chapter 2 of The German Ideology.

History
During Engels' short stay in Paris (1844), Marx suggested that they should write together a critique of the rage of their day, the Young Hegelians. While accomplishing their plan, the first joint writing project between the two men was accomplished and thus the beginning of their friendship.

After conversing, they began drawing up plans for a book about the Young Hegelian trend of thought very popular in academic circles. Agreeing to co-author the Foreword, they divided up the other sections. Engels finished his assigned chapters before leaving Paris. Marx had the larger share of work, and he completed it by the end of November 1844. Marx would draw from his Economic and Philosophic Manuscripts, on which he had been working the spring and summer of 1844.

The foremost title line—"The Holy Family"—was added at the suggestion of the book publisher Lowenthal. It is a sarcastic reference to the Bauer brothers (Bruno and Edgar) and their supporters amongst the Hegelians who had attempted a critical renovation of Christianity, hence the subtitle a "Critique of Critical Critique."  Later Marx will continue this sarcasm by referring to them as Saint Bruno, Saint Max (Stirner), etc.

The book made something of a splash in the newspapers. One paper noted that it expressed socialist views since it criticized the "inadequacy of any half-measures directed at eliminating the social ailments of our time." The conservative press immediately recognized the radical elements inherent in its many arguments. One paper wrote that, in The Holy Family, "every line preaches revolt... against the state, the church, the family, legality, religion and property." It also noted that "prominence is given to the most radical and the most open communism, and this is all the more dangerous as Mr. Marx cannot be denied either extremely broad knowledge or the ability to make use of the polemical arsenal of Hegel's logic, what is customarily called 'iron logic.'"

External links
Complete German text (Die Heilige Familie)
Complete English text (The Holy Family or Critique of Critical Criticism. Against Bruno Bauer and Company)
Complete English text in PDF format

1844 non-fiction books
Books by Karl Marx and Friedrich Engels